Marc-Antoine Bourdon Vatry (24 November 1761, Saint-Maur-des-Fossés – 22 April 1828, Paris), brother of Louis-François Bourdon, was a French Naval Minister.

He began in 1778 as a clerk in the offices of the navy at Brest, and as Expeditionary Secretary of Jean-Baptiste Donatien de Vimeur, comte de Rochambeau in the United States (1781–1783).
 
Back in France he was appointed director of the colonies at the Department of Navy (1792–1797). 
On 3 July 1799, he became Minister of Marine and remained until 1800.

Under the Consulate and Empire, he was maritime prefect of Le Havre, prefect of Vaucluse, and Maine-et-Loire in 1809, Prefect of Gênes. This town erected a statue in memory of the work he had done in this port.  During the Hundred Days, he was prefect of the Isère.

References 

1761 births
1828 deaths
People from Saint-Maur-des-Fossés
French Naval Ministers
Ministers of Marine and the Colonies
Prefects of France
Prefects of Maine-et-Loire
Prefects of Isère
Burials at Père Lachaise Cemetery